Richard Yaffe (June 10, 1903 – October 30, 1986), was a journalist and founding editor in chief of Israel Horizons magazine. He was also a special correspondent of the Columbia Broadcasting System. In 1950 he was part of the Hollywood blacklist. He died in New York Hospital in 1986 of pneumonia.

References

1903 births
1986 deaths
Deaths from pneumonia in New York City